Wadithamnus is a genus of flowering plants belonging to the family Amaranthaceae.

Its native range is the Arabian Peninsula.

Species:
 Wadithamnus artemisioides (Vierh. & O.Schwartz) T.Hammer & R.W.Davis

References

Amaranthaceae
Amaranthaceae genera